The 2015 Kaduna State gubernatorial election occurred on April 11, 2015. Nasir el-Rufai of the APC took a clear lead against the incumbent governor and PDP, Mukhtar Ramalan Yero candidate in the election. The APC candidate won in 17 LGAs, while the PDP claimed the other six.

Earlier on, in January 2015, in a pre-election poll for the Kaduna gubernatorial elections organised by the ANAP Foundation, the result showed el-Rufai leading Yero by a gap of 26% in-between them; the former having 46% of total votes, and the latter 20%. 23% of the voters, however, remained indecisive.

Nasir Ahmad el-Rufai emerged winner in the APC gubernatorial primary election. His running mate was Yusuf Barnabas Bala.

Electoral system 
The Governor of Kaduna State is elected using the plurality voting system.

Primary election

APC primary
The APC primary election began Thursday, December 4, 2014, ending early on Friday December 5, when results were announced at about 8:30 AM at the Kaduna International Trade Fair Complex where the event was held. Nasir el-Rufai overcame four other contenders, polling 1,965 votes to become the winner of the contest. There were a total of 3,557 accredited delegates, 3,546 total vote cast of which 3,518 were valid and 28 invalid, as reported the returning officer, Prince Ekenyem Orizu.

Candidates
Party nominee: Nasir el-Rufai: Winner (1,965 votes)
Running mate: 
 Isah Ashiru: Runner-up (1,379 votes)
 Haruna Saeed: 2nd Runner-up (127 votes)
 Shamshudeen Abdullahi Ango: 3rd Runner-up (25 votes)
 Salihu Mohammed Lukman: 4th Runner-up (22 votes)

PDP primary
The PDP primary election was held at Murtala Square Kaduna on December 7, 2014. After all but one of the other aspirants stepped down for him, Mukhtar Ramalan Yero, the incumbent governor emerged with the highest votes, polling 970, while his only contender, Senator Haruna Aziz Zego, got a lone vote, out of a total of 972 delegate votes.

Candidates
Party nominee: Mukhtar Ramalan Yero: Incumbent governor.
Running mate:
 Haruna Zego: Runner-up
 Ajeye Bako: Withdrew
 Lawal Yakawada: Withdrew
 Felix Hyatt: Withdrew

Results
A total of 14 candidates registered with the Independent National Electoral Commission to contest in the election. The PDP candidate scored the highest, polling a total of 1,117,635 votes to oust the APC contestant and incumbent governor, who emerged second with 485,833 votes, while the APGA candidate came third, with 20,140 votes. There were 3,357,469 registered voters across the state, out of which 1,710,935 were accredited, but just 1,660,109 voted, according to the INEC Returning Officer.

By local government area
The results of the election by local government area are here, representing the two major contenders. The total valid votes of 1,629,157 represents the 14 political parties that participated in the election. Green represents LGAs won by Yero. Blue represents LGAs won by el-Rufai.

References 

Kaduna State gubernatorial elections
Gubernatorial election 2015
Kaduna State gubernatorial election